The 2010 FIA Formula Two Championship season was the second year of the FIA Formula Two Championship. The championship began on 18 April at Silverstone and concluded on 19 September at the Circuit Ricardo Tormo in Valencia, after nine double-header rounds.

For most of the season, the championship battle revolved around a pair of British drivers, returning driver Jolyon Palmer and Formula Renault UK graduate Dean Stoneman. Stoneman and Palmer won eleven of the season's eighteen races – Stoneman won six and Palmer five – but more podiums for Stoneman helped him in the long run, and eventually sealed the championship title, and a prize test for the Williams F1 team, with a race to spare. Palmer finished a comfortable second place in the standings, 42 points behind Stoneman and 85 ahead of his nearest rival.

Third place in the standings remained a five-way battle until the final race with newcomers Sergey Afanasyev of Russia, another British driver Will Bratt and Belgium's Benjamin Bailly, as well as returnees Kazim Vasiliauskas of Lithuania and Austria's Philipp Eng all in contention for the remaining FIA Super Licence awarded to the top three championship finishers. Despite not winning a race, it was Afanasyev that prevailed, scoring points in all but three races including four podiums. Vasiliauskas' only victory of the season came in the final race of the season in Valencia, and allowed him to jump from seventh pre-race to an end fourth place in the standings, four points behind Afanasyev. Bratt finished fifth, winless but with four podiums, ahead of three-time winner Eng by two points and Bailly, a winner at his home round of Zolder was 12 points further behind. Eighth-placed Nicola de Marco was the only other race-winner on the season, winning at Brno and Valencia.

Regulation changes
Races were also extended to 40 minutes in duration, and implemented the 25–18–15–12–10–8–6–4–2–1 point-scoring system as was introduced to the 2010 Formula One World Championship.

Drivers
The number of drivers admitted to the series had been expected to increase to 30. However, this was altered back to 24, with only 22 drivers appearing on the Silverstone entry list.

Driver changes
 Entering FIA Formula Two Championship
 Russian drivers Sergey Afanasyev – who was  International Formula Master runner-up – and Ivan Samarin made their debut in the series.
 Formul'Academy Euro Series champion Benjamin Bailly graduated to the championship.
 Euroseries 3000 champion Will Bratt debuted in the series.
 Johan Jokinen switched from the Formula 3 Euro Series to the championship.
 After all taking a year's sabbatical, Natalia Kowalska, Ajith Kumar and Julian Theobald all returned to racing competition.
 International GT Open driver Plamen Kralev switched to Formula Two.
 Benjamin Lariche, who had a dual programme in the Formula Renault Eurocup and the Formula Renault 2.0 West European Cup in 2009, joined the championship.
 Mihai Marinescu, who competed in the Formula Renault 3.5 Series with Interwetten.com Racing, joined the championship.
 Formula Palmer Audi graduates Ramón Piñeiro and Paul Rees moved into the series.
 Kelvin Snoeks, who had a season in International Formula Master joined the series' grid.
 Formula Renault UK driver Dean Stoneman made his series debut.
 A1 Grand Prix driver Parthiva Sureshwaren moved into the series.
 After competing in the GP2 Series in 2009, Ricardo Teixeira switched to the FIA Formula Two Championship.

 Leaving FIA Formula Two Championship
 Third-placed Mikhail Aleshin returned to the Formula Renault 3.5 Series with Carlin.
 Mirko Bortolotti joined the Ferrari Driver Academy and moved into the GP3 Series with the Addax Team. Robert Wickens and Tobias Hegewald also moved to the  series.
 Alex Brundle switched to the British Formula 3 Championship with T-Sport.
 Natacha Gachnang joined the newly created FIA GT1 World Championship with Matech Competition.
 Pietro Gandolfi moved into the Italian Prototype Championship.
 Ollie Hancock switched to the World Sportscar Masters series.
Sebastian Hohenthal, Jens Höing, Jason Moore and Germán Sánchez all retired from auto racing.
 Carlos Iaconelli and Edoardo Piscopo switched to Auto GP with Durango and DAMS respectively.
 Julien Jousse moved to Superleague Formula.
 Henri Karjalainen moved into the Finnish GT3 Championship.
 Miloš Pavlović took a two-year hiatus.
 Champion Andy Soucek became Virgin Racing Formula One test and reserve driver.
 Henry Surtees died in a racing accident during the series' 2009 event at Brands Hatch.
 Tristan Vautier switched to the Star Mazda Championship with Andersen Racing.

Calendar
A nine-round calendar was published on 21 October 2009. The series ventured outside of Europe, racing in Marrakech, after being an all-European series in 2009.

Results

Standings

Drivers' Championship

References

External links
 The official website of the FIA Formula Two Championship

FIA Formula Two Championship seasons
FIA Formula Two season 2010
Formula Two